The dark-eyed white-eye (Zosterops tetiparius) is a species of bird in the family Zosteropidae. It is found in the Solomon Islands. Its natural habitat is subtropical or tropical moist lowland forest.

Z. t. paradoxus is found on Rendova and Z. t. tetiparius on Tetepare Island. The subspecies have never been recorded away from their respective home islands which lie just 3.4 km apart.

References

dark-eyed white-eye
Birds of the Western Province (Solomon Islands)
dark-eyed white-eye
dark-eyed white-eye